Cash Crop is a documentary film by writer-director Adam Ross about cannabis' economic impact in the U.S. state of California.

References

External links
 

American films about cannabis
Cannabis in California
2010 films
2010s English-language films
2010s American films